KOAC-FM (89.7 FM) is a radio station licensed to Astoria, Oregon, United States. The station is owned by Oregon Public Broadcasting, and airs OPBs news and talk programming, consisting of syndicated programming from NPR, APM and PRI, as well as locally produced offerings.

External links
opb.org

OAC-FM
OAC-FM
Astoria, Oregon
1997 establishments in Oregon